The Legende 1 Ton is a French sailboat that was designed by Doug Peterson as an International Offshore Rule One Ton class racer and first built in 1984.

The design started with a class prototype, named Legende and was later developed into the Sun Legende 41 cruiser-racer.

Production
The design was built by Jeanneau in France, starting in 1984, but it is now out of production.

Design
The Legende 1 Ton is a racing keelboat, built predominantly of fiberglass. It has a fractional sloop rig and a fixed fin keel. It displaces  and carries  of lead ballast.

Operational history
The boat was at one time supported by an active class club that organized racing events, the One Ton class.

See also
List of sailing boat types

References

Keelboats
1980s sailboat type designs
Sailing yachts
Sailboat type designs by Doug Peterson
Sailboat types built by Jeanneau